The San Diego State University College of Health and Human Services faculty, through advising, teaching, and supervising, offers students academic study, field placement, clinical experiences, and research opportunities. The College offers professional education in the health and human service disciplines. The College consists of the following group of professional schools, and departments: the School of Speech, Language, and Hearing Sciences, the School of Nursing, the School of Social Work, the Department of Gerontology, and the Graduate School of Public Health.

Academics
college homepage

Degrees
 BA
 BS
 MA
 MPH
 MS
 MSW
 Au.D
 Ph.D

Special Degrees
 MSW and J.D. Joint Degree
 (Offered in conjunction with California Western School of Law)
 Joint MSW-JD home page

Departments
The College of Health and Human Services includes several schools and academic departments:
 See Department Summary and Index
 School of Speech, Language, and Hearing Sciences
 Gerontology
 Health Science (Community Health Education)
 Nursing
 School of Nursing
 Public Health
 Graduate School of Public Health
 Social Work
 School of Social Work

(Note that Pre-Professional Studies in medicine, veterinary medicine, and dentistry are offered by SDSU's College of Sciences.)

Institutes/Research Centers
 Heart Institute
 Center for Alcohol and Other Drug Studies and Services
 Social Policy Institute
 Consensus Organizing Center
 Institute for Nursing Research
 San Diego Prevention Research Center
 Institute for Public Health
 Center for Behavioral and Community Health Studies
 Center for Behavioral Epidemiology and Community Health
 Center for Injury Prevention Policy and Practice
 Communications Clinic for Speech, Language, Hearing Disorders and Deafness
 University Center on Aging
 Center for Injury Prevention and Research

See also
San Diego State University

External links
 Carnegie Foundation profile for SDSU

Nursing schools in California
Schools of public health in the United States
H